The 1959 Brisbane Rugby League season was the 51st season of the Brisbane Rugby League premiership. Seven teams from across Brisbane competed for the premiership, which culminated in Northern Suburbs defeating Past Brothers 24-18 to claim their first premiership since 1950.

Ladder

Finals 

Source:

References 

1959 in rugby league
1959 in Australian rugby league
Rugby league in Brisbane